Alessandro Fusco (born 28 October 1999) is an Italian professional rugby union player who primarily plays scrum-half for Zebre Parma in the United Rugby Championship. He has also represented Italy at international level, having made his test debut against Argentina during the 2021 Autumn Nations Series. Fusco has previously played for clubs such as Fiamme Oro in the past.

Fusco is the great-grandson of Elio Fusco, a 1960s Neapolitan rugby icon who played eleven times for Italy and coached the storied Partenope, winners of the Top10 in 1965 and 1966. His grandfather was an Italian rugby player as well.

Professional career 
Fusco has previously played for clubs such as Fiamme Oro in the past.
For the end of 2019–20 Pro14 season and for 2020–21 Pro14 season, Fusco was named as Permit Player for Zebre. He made his Zebre debut in Round 6 of the 2020–21 Pro14 against Munster.

In 2018 and 2019, Fusco was named in the Italy Under 20 squad. On the 31 October 2021, he was selected by Kieran Crowley to be part of an Italy 34-man squad for the 2021 end-of-year rugby union internationals. He made his debut against Argentina.

In 2022, Fusco became the first person from Naples to play in the Six Nations, when replacing Stephen Varney in Italy's loss to England.

Fusco was named in Kieran Crowley's 33-man squad for the 2022 end-of-year rugby union internationals.

References

External links 

1999 births
Living people
Italian rugby union players
Zebre Parma players
Rugby union scrum-halves
Fiamme Oro Rugby players
Italy international rugby union players
Sportspeople from Naples